Sweet Old World is the fourth studio album by American singer-songwriter Lucinda Williams, released on August 25, 1992, by Chameleon Records.

An alternative country and roots rock album, Sweet Old World was met with widespread critical acclaim upon release, and remains one of Williams best reviewed works. She produced the album with Dusty Wakeman and Gurf Morlix, the three of them having previously produced her earlier album, Lucinda Williams (1988). Emmylou Harris covered the title song on her album Wrecking Ball (1995).

On April 28, 2017, Williams performed the album in its entirety at Minneapolis' First Avenue nightclub; the live recording was released to commemorate Sweet Old Worlds 25th anniversary in August. She re-recorded the album more to her liking and released it later that year as This Sweet Old World, which earned further critical acclaim.

Critical reception 

Sweet Old World was voted the 11th best album of 1992 in The Village Voices Pazz & Jop, an annual poll of prominent music critics. Robert Christgau, the poll's creator, ranked it 6th on his own year-end list, later writing that the album was "gorgeous, flawless, brilliant [with] short-story details ('chess pieces,' 'dresses that zip up the side') packing a textural thrill akin to local color". In a contemporary review, Audio magazine said Sweet Old World proves Williams is "a riveting writer and performer whose apparent simplicity is merely the entranceway to a rewarding artist of depth", while Stereo Review wrote "She delivers her searing lines without artificial sentiment or extraneous embellishment, just a wrenching directness that nourishes the spirit and knows no detour to the heart."

In a retrospective review for The Rolling Stone Album Guide (2004), David McGee and Milo Miles later wrote Williams was a "damned determined artist" on Sweet Old World, in which the perspectives of her previous work--"adult, Southern, female, sensual but neurotic"—were stronger and more focused. AllMusic's Steve Huey said it was just as good as her 1988 self-titled album, calling it "a gorgeous, elegiac record that not only consolidates but expands Williams' ample talents." Like her self-titled album, Bill Friskics-Warren wrote in The Washington Post, Sweet Old World showcased Williams' "sharply drawn odes to desire and loss", sung with a "grainy drawl" and backed against a "lean, bluesy roots-rock" sound.

Track listing
All tracks written by Lucinda Williams, except where noted.

"Six Blocks Away" – 2:52
"Something About What Happens When We Talk" – 3:50
"He Never Got Enough Love" (Williams, Betty Elders) – 3:52
"Sweet Old World" – 4:03
"Little Angel, Little Brother" – 4:25
"Pineola" – 4:10
"Lines Around Your Eyes" – 2:29
"Prove My Love" – 2:48
"Sidewalks of the City" – 3:46
"Memphis Pearl" (Williams, Lorne Rall) – 3:48
"Hot Blood" – 5:27
"Which Will" (Nick Drake) – 3:49

Personnel
 Lucinda Williams – lead vocals, acoustic guitar
 Gurf Morlix – electric and acoustic guitar, pedal steel, dobro, mandolin, lap steel, beer bottle and background vocals
 Duane Jarvis – electric guitar
 John Ciambotti – electric and upright bass
 Donald Lindley – drums and percussion
 Doug Atwell – fiddle
 Byron Berline – fiddle & mandolin
 Skip Edwards – Hammond B-3 organ
 Benmont Tench – Hammond B-3 organ
 William "Smitty" Smith – Hammond B-3 organ
 Gia Ciambotti, Jim Lauderdale, Dusty Wakeman – background vocals

Charts

References

External links 
 
Lucinda Williams Official Website

Lucinda Williams albums
1992 albums